Gap Road Cemetery or Wimbledon Cemetery is a cemetery located in Wimbledon, London. 20 acres in size, the cemetery was opened in 1876, and contains three chapels, including two disused historical chapels, one for Church of England services and another for Dissenters (Nonconformists).

Notable burials 
Notable burials include:
Colin Scott-Moncrieff (1836–1916), British engineer, soldier and civil servant
Imogen Hassall, (1942–1980), English actress

The cemetery also contains the war graves of 127 Commonwealth service personnel from World War I and World War II.

References

External links

 

Cemeteries in London
1876 establishments in England